John Henry Hager (August 28, 1936August 23, 2020) was an American politician who served as the 37th Lieutenant Governor of Virginia from 1998 to 2002. He was the first person with a disability to be elected to that office. He proceeded to act as an assistant secretary within the United States Department of Education from 2004 to 2007. He also served as the chairman of the Republican Party of Virginia from August 2007 until May 2008.

Early life and education
Hager was born in Durham, North Carolina. He started a neighborhood newspaper in 1945. While an undergraduate at Purdue University, he ran a vending machine business, was an active member of Sigma Alpha Epsilon, and was a member of ROTC. One term, his course load was 25 credit hours – about two-thirds more than normal. He graduated with a BSME (mechanical engineering) in 1958. Both his parents, Virgil (1905–2002) and Ruth Rabbe Hager (1906–2000), were 1928 Purdue alumni. Hager earned his MBA from Harvard Business School in 1960, and subsequently served in the United States Army, rising to the rank of captain.

Career
After his active duty military service, Hager began work for the American Tobacco Company in Richmond, Virginia. The company retired him after his bout with polio, but he returned – beginning at the bottom again. At American Tobacco, he served as a government affairs representative. Hager was forcibly retired from the American Tobacco Company after the company's sale in 1994.

In 1975, he volunteered for Lieutenant Governor John N. Dalton, and in 1984 he was a delegate to the Republican National Convention. In 1994, he co-chaired the Senatorial campaign for Oliver North. He ran for state party chairman in 1992, and was treasurer of the state Republican Party in 1994.

Hager served as the director of Virginia's homeland security under Governors Jim Gilmore and Mark Warner. He was elected Lieutenant Governor of Virginia in 1997, defeating Democrat Lewis F. Payne Jr. At one of the hustings in the aforementioned election, he said, "I've met a lot of challenges in my life. It's been a trail of turning challenge into opportunity". Hager was the first individual with a disability to be elected to that office, and is believed to be the first in any U.S. state to have been so.

Hager ran for Governor of Virginia in 2001, but lost the Republican nomination  to Virginia's then Attorney General, Mark Earley. The latter ultimately lost the gubernatorial election to Democrat Mark Warner. Hager went on to serve in Warner's cabinet as the state's homeland security director in the Office of Commonwealth Preparedness. This post was created in the aftermath of the September 11 attacks.

Hager was the Assistant Secretary of the Department of Education's Office of Special Education and Rehabilitation Services. He was nominated to this position by President George W. Bush on May 24, 2004, and confirmed by the Senate on November 21, 2004. While in office, he endeavored to finalize the Department's regulations concerning the reauthorized Individuals with Disabilities Education Act (IDEA) within one year, as well as to give technical assistance to states in implementing IDEA. He also sought to enhance the Department's outreach, and advocated for transition services for individuals with disabilities to be given more attention. He resigned after three years at the helm, effective August 1, 2007.

In July 2007, Hager was elected to serve as chairman of the Republican Party of Virginia.
However, he was defeated for reelection by Delegate Jeff Frederick less than a year later in May 2008.

Personal life
Hager married Margaret Dickinson "Maggie" Chase on February 27, 1971. The couple had two sons, John (b. 1973) and Henry (b. 1978). Hager's younger son, Henry, married Jenna Bush, the daughter of George W. Bush the 43th President of the United States, on May 10, 2008, at her parents' Prairie Chapel Ranch in Crawford, Texas.

In 1973, he contracted polio when his son was vaccinated for the disease with live virus vaccine. 
As a result, he used a non-motorized wheelchair for daily ambulation. He was known to compete in wheelchair races.

Death 
Hager died on August 23, 2020, five days prior to his 84th birthday. Governor Ralph Northam ordered state flags to be flown at half-staff until sunset on September 2.

Memberships
American Legion
Chairman, Disability Commission
vice-chmn. Gov.'s Commn. on Transp. Policy
bd. dir., vice-chair Aerospace State Assn.
Director, President, Sorensen Institute of Political Leadership
Finance Committee, Virginia Museum of Fine Arts
past pres., trustee, exec. com. Children's Hosp.

Honors and awards
Honorary degree from Mary Washington College
Honorary degree from Averett College
Honorary degree from the University of Northern Virginia
Distinguished Engineering Alumnus, Purdue University College of Engineering, 2007
Outstanding Young Men of America, 1976
Man of the Year, Tobacco International Magazine, 1990
Alumni Citizenship award, Purdue University, 1987
Distinguished Alumni award, Durham Academy, 1992
Lettie Pate Whitehead Evans award, Westminster-Canterbury, 1997
Humanitarian award, National Conference for Community and Justice, 2002

References

External links

1936 births
2020 deaths
20th-century American businesspeople
20th-century American politicians
21st-century American politicians
Bush family
Businesspeople in the tobacco industry
Harvard Business School alumni
Lieutenant Governors of Virginia
Military personnel from North Carolina
Politicians from Durham, North Carolina
Politicians with paraplegia
People with polio
American politicians with disabilities
Purdue University College of Engineering alumni
Republican Party of Virginia chairs
State cabinet secretaries of Virginia
United States Army officers
United States Department of Education officials
Duke family
Virginia Republicans